Genting Monorail was the first monorail service in Malaysia and a former theme park monorail service at Genting Highlands, which was designed to look like a caterpillar. The trains of the monorail were used at the Dutch Floriade in 1992, before they were sold to the Malaysian theme park and operated from 1994 until 1 July 2013.

References

External links
Photo at Flickr

Defunct monorails
1994 establishments in Malaysia
2013 disestablishments in Malaysia
Monorails in Malaysia
Genting Highlands